Robert Vaughn Newland (October 27, 1948 – June 30, 2021) was an American professional football player who was a wide receiver in the National Football League (NFL). He was drafted by the New Orleans Saints in the seventh round of the 1971 NFL Draft. He played college football for the Oregon Ducks.

Early years
Newland attended North Eugene High School in Eugene, Oregon. He went to college at the University of Oregon, where he was the most valuable player for the Ducks in 1970.

Death
Newland died on June 30, 2021, aged 72.

References

1948 births
2021 deaths
Sportspeople from Medford, Oregon
Sportspeople from Eugene, Oregon
American football wide receivers
Oregon Ducks football players
New Orleans Saints players
Players of American football from Oregon